Clotworthy Skeffington, 4th Viscount Massereene (died 11 February 1738) was an Anglo-Irish politician and peer.

He was the son of Clotworthy Skeffington, 3rd Viscount Massereene and Rachel Hungerford. He served in the Irish House of Commons as the Member of Parliament for Antrim County between 1703 and 1714. In March 1714 he succeeded to his father's title and assumed his seat in the Irish House of Lords.

On 9 September 1713 he married Lady Catherine Chichester, daughter of Arthur Chichester, 3rd Earl of Donegall. Together they had seven children. He was succeeded in his title by his eldest son, Clotworthy Skeffington, who was made Earl of Massereene in 1756.

References

Year of birth unknown
1738 deaths
18th-century Anglo-Irish people
Skeffington, Clotworthy
Skeffington, Clotworthy
Members of the Irish House of Lords
Viscounts in the Peerage of Ireland
Members of the Parliament of Ireland (pre-1801) for County Antrim constituencies